In Egypt, the academic grading system functions with a worded grade and increases in increments from 10 to 30 points.

The title jayyid jiddan or very good, denotes the second highest mark possible, on par with a "B" student.

References 

Egypt
Grading
Grading